The 2012 CAF Confederation Cup knock-out stage matches took place in November 2012. The matchdays were: 2–4 November (semifinals first leg), 9–11 November (semifinals second leg), 16–18 November (final first leg), 23–25 December (final second leg).

All knock-out ties were decided over two legs, with aggregate goals used to determine the winner. If the sides were level on aggregate after the second leg, the away goals rule applied, and if still level, the tie proceeded directly to a penalty shootout (no extra time is played).

Qualified teams
The knock-out stage featured four teams: the two group winners and the two group runners-up from the group stage. In the semi-finals, the group A winners played the group B runners-up, and the group B winners played the group A runners-up. In both ties, the group winners hosted the second leg at home.

Semifinals

AC Léopards won 2–1 on aggregate and advanced to the 2012 CAF Confederation Cup Final.

2–2 on aggregate. Djoliba won the penalty shootout and advanced to the 2012 CAF Confederation Cup Final.

Final

AC Léopards won 4–3 on aggregate.

References

External links
CAF Confederation Cup

Knock-out Stage